The Wassmer WA-51 Pacific is a French four-seat cabin monoplane designed and built by Société Wassmer. Different-powered variants include the Wassmer WA-52 Europa and the Wassmer WA-54 Atlantic.  It was the world's first composite material-built aircraft.

Design and development
Having manufactured glass-fibre cowlings for Bébé, D112 and D120 Jodels, increasing number of glass-fibre parts for their Javelot, Bijave and Super-Javelot gliders, and then Super-IV aircraft, in 1966 Wassmer first flew the glass-fibre WA-50 prototype, a single-engined four-seat cabin monoplane with a retractable tricycle landing gear. Originally designed as a three-seater powered by a 115cv Potez engine, engine unavailability at the time resulted in a 150cv Lycoming O-320 being used instead and the aircraft becoming a 4-seater.  Using the same profile as the Super-IV but only 8.6m span, and compensated with large slotted flaps, the wings were formed from two moulded halves and contained two 70 litre fuel tanks.  The fuselage was also manufactured as two halves, and featured butterfly doors.

The design entered production as the WA-51 Pacific with a fixed tricycle landing gear. The low-wing cantilever monoplane was powered by a nose-mounted 150 hp (112 kW) Lycoming O-320-E2A piston engine. A variant, powered by a 160 hp (119 kW) Lycoming IO-320-B1A was called the WA-52 Europa. Further refinements produced the 180 hp (134 kW) Lycoming O-360-A1LD powered WA-54 Atlantic.

Variants
WA-50
Prototype with retractable landing gear, first flew 22 March 1966, one built, registration F-WNZZ. Fuselage is color molded with integral leading edge fuel tanks.
WA-51 Pacific
Production version first flown in 1969 with a 150hp (112kW) Lycoming O-320-E2A engine, 39 built.
WA-52 Europa
As WA-51 with a 160hp (119kW) Lycoming IO-320-B1A engine, 59 built.
WA-53
Proposed variant with a 125hp Lycoming engine, not built.
WA-54 Atlantic
WA-51 with refinements and a 180hp (134kW) Lycoming O-360-A1LD engine, 55 built.

Specifications (WA-54 Atlantic)

See also
 Windecker Eagle

References

Bibliography
Battarel, Michel (1966).  Chez Wassmer, l'avion "tout plastique" devient une réalité.  Air et Cosmos, 141 pp. 36–38

1960s French civil utility aircraft
Wassmer aircraft
Single-engined tractor aircraft
Low-wing aircraft
Aircraft first flown in 1966